Club Sportif et Culturel de Cayenne (CSC de Cayenne) is a French Guianese football team based in the region's capital Cayenne that plays in the French Guiana Championnat National.

References

Football clubs in French Guiana
Cayenne